Philosophy, Politics and Economics (PPE) at Oxford University has traditionally been a degree read by those seeking a career in politics,  public life (including senior positions in His Majesty's Civil Service) and journalism.

This list does not include those notable figures, such as former U.S. President Bill Clinton, who studied PPE at the university but did not complete their degrees.

UK politicians

 Danny Alexander, former British Liberal Democrat MP and former Chief Secretary to the Treasury
 Rushanara Ali, British Labour MP
 Ed Balls, former British Labour MP, former Secretary of State for Children, Schools and Families, and Strictly Come Dancing contestant
 Alan Beith, former British Liberal Democrat MP
 Tony Benn, former British Labour MP and Cabinet minister
 Nicholas Boles, former British Conservative MP
 Kevin Brennan, British Labour MP
 David Cameron, former British Conservative Prime Minister
 Barbara Castle, former Labour MP and former Cabinet minister
 Christopher Chataway, former Conservative MP, journalist and athlete
 James Clappison, former British Conservative MP
 Yvette Cooper,  British Labour MP and former Secretary of State for Work and Pensions
 Julian Critchley, former British Conservative MP
 Anthony Crosland, former Labour MP and former Cabinet minister
 Edwina Currie, British Conservative MP (1983–97) and former Minister
 Ed Davey, Leader of the British Liberal Democrat party and MP
 Geraint Davies, British Labour MP
 Anneliese Dodds, British Labour MP and former MEP
 Alan Duncan, former British Conservative MP and former Minister for International Development
 Philip Dunne, British Conservative MP
 Angela Eagle, British Labour MP and twin sister of Maria Eagle
 Maria Eagle, British Labour MP and twin sister of Angela Eagle
 Jane Ellison, former British Conservative MP
 Paul Farrelly, British Labour MP
 Laura Farris, British Conservative MP
 Michael Foot, former leader of the Labour Party, former Leader of the Opposition and author
 Derek Foster, former Labour MP
 Hugh Gaitskell, British politician and former leader of the Labour Party
 George Gardiner, former British Conservative MP
 Helen Goodman, former British Labour MP
 Damian Green, British Conservative MP
 Sam Gyimah, former British Conservative Party MP
 William Hague, former British Conservative Party MP and former Secretary of State for Foreign and Commonwealth Affairs
 Duncan Hames, former British Liberal Democrat MP
 Philip Hammond, former British Conservative MP and former Chancellor of the Exchequer
 Matt Hancock, British Conservative MP and former Secretary of State for Health and Social Care
 Mark Harper, British Conservative MP and Secretary of State for Transport
 Edward Heath, Conservative British Prime Minister (1970–74)
 David Heathcoat-Amory, former British Conservative MP
 Michael Heseltine, former British Conservative MP and former Deputy Prime Minister
 Meg Hillier, British Labour MP
 Steve Hilton, British Conservative Party Spin Doctor
 Damian Hinds, British Conservative Party MP and former Secretary of State for Education
 Richard Howitt, former European Labour Party MEP
 Chris Huhne, former British Liberal Democrat MP (2005–13) and Secretary of State for Energy and Climate Change (2010–12)
 Jeremy Hunt, British Conservative MP, Chancellor of the Exchequer and former Secretary of State for Foreign and Commonwealth Affairs
 Baroness Jay, British Labour politician and former Leader of the House of Lords
 Roy Jenkins, former Labour Cabinet minister and Deputy Leader of the Labour Party (UK), President of the European Commission, Chancellor of the University of Oxford and co-founder of the Social Democratic Party
 Gerald Kaufman, former British Labour MP
 Ruth Kelly, former British Labour MP and Cabinet minister
 Susan Kramer, Baroness Kramer, Liberal Democrat peer and former Liberal MP
 Lord Lawson, British former Conservative MP and former Chancellor of the Exchequer
 Lord Mandelson, British Labour politician, former Secretary of State for Business, Enterprise and Regulatory Reform, and former EU Commissioner
 David Miliband, former British Labour MP, former Foreign Secretary and older brother of Ed Miliband
 Ed Miliband, British Labour MP, former Leader of the Labour party and former Secretary of State for Energy and Climate Change
 Rhodri Morgan, former Labour AM and former First Minister for Wales
 Neil O'Brien, British Conservative MP
 Lord Longford (1905–2001), prison reform advocate and politician
 Brian Paddick, former Metropolitan Police Service deputy assistant commissioner and Liberal Democrat politician
 James Purnell, former British Labour MP and Secretary of State for Work and Pensions
 Tim Rathbone, British former Conservative MP
 Mark Reckless, former British UKIP and Conservative MP
 Rachel Reeves, British Labour MP and Shadow Chancellor of the Exchequer
 Emma Reynolds, former British Labour MP
 Barbara Roche, former British Labour MP
 Siôn Simon, former British Labour MEP and MP
 Jacqui Smith, former British Labour MP and Home Secretary
 John Spellar, British Labour MP
 Rory Stewart, British diplomat, academic, writer and former Conservative Party MP
 Will Straw,  British policy researcher and Labour politician
 Rishi Sunak, British Conservative Prime Minister and former Chancellor of the Exchequer
 Matthew Taylor, former British Liberal Democrat MP
 Nick Thomas-Symonds, British Labour MP 
 Liz Truss, former British Conservative Prime Minister and former Foreign Secretary
 Stephen Twigg, Director of the Foreign Policy Centre and Labour MP
 Andrew Tyrie, former British Conservative MP and current Chairman of the Competition and Markets Authority
 Kitty Ussher, former British Labour MP
 Steve Webb, former British Liberal Democrat MP
 Helen Whately, British Conservative MP
 Ann Widdecombe, former British Conservative MP and former Brexit Party MEP
 David Willetts, former British Conservative MP
 Shirley Williams, former Labour Cabinet minister and co-founder of the Social Democratic Party
 Harold Wilson, former British Labour Prime Minister
 Stewart Wood, Baron Wood of Anfield, British Labour Peer
 George Young, former British Conservative MP
 Baroness Young, British Conservative politician and first female Leader of the House of Lords

Non-UK politicians

 Tony Abbott, 28th and former Prime Minister of Australia
 Liaqat Ali Khan, first Prime Minister of Pakistan
 Solomon Dias Bandaranaike, former Prime Minister of Ceylon
 Benazir Bhutto, former Prime Minister of Pakistan
 Zulfiqar Ali Bhutto, former Prime Minister of Pakistan
 David Boren, former Oklahoma Governor and US Senator
 Kofi Abrefa Busia, former President of Ghana
 Pete Buttigieg, United States Secretary of Transportation
 Korn Chatikavanij, former Finance Minister of Thailand
 Calvin Cheng, former Singaporean Nominated MP 
 Gareth Evans (politician), former Foreign Minister of Australia
 Malcolm Fraser, former Prime Minister of Australia
 Urszula Gacek, Polish Diplomat, former Polish MEP and Senator
 Bob Hawke, former Prime Minister of Australia
 Khairy Jamaluddin, Minister of Health of Malaysia
 Imran Khan, Pakistani cricketer and politician, 22nd and former Prime Minister of Pakistan 
 Pedro Pablo Kuczynski, former Prime Minister of Peru and former President
 John Kufuor, former President of Ghana
 Farooq Leghari, former President of Pakistan
 Martin Mansergh, former Irish politician
 Sukhumbhand Paribatra, former Governor of Bangkok
 Kukrit Pramoj, former Prime Minister of Thailand
 Tony Pua, Malaysian blogger and opposition MP
 Radosław Sikorski, Polish politician and journalist, former minister of foreign affairs of Poland and Marshal of the Sejm
 Aung San Suu Kyi, first State Counsellor of Myanmar, 1991 Nobel Peace Prize Laureate
 Chris Thomas, former Isle of Man Minister for Policy and Reform
 Euclid Tsakalotos, finance minister of Greece and the country's chief negotiator with the Troika
 Abhisit Vejjajiva, former Prime Minister of Thailand
 Sim Ann, Senior Minister of State of Singapore
 Parit Wacharasindhu, Thai politician

Broadcasters, journalists, media (UK)

 Jackie Ashley, British broadcast and newspaper journalist
 Zeinab Badawi, British broadcast journalist
 Zanny Minton Beddoes, Editor-in-chief of The Economist magazine
 Jana Bennett, Director of BBC Vision and non-executive director, BBC Worldwide
 Camilla Cavendish, journalist, The Times
 Michael Cockerell, political television documentaries
 Nick Cohen, journalist
 Michael Crick, British journalist, author and broadcaster
 Nick Davies, British investigative journalist
 Evan Davis, British economic journalist
 Rowenna Davis, Labour councillor and "Sunday Politics" pundit
 David Dimbleby, television presenter
 Bill Emmott, journalist
 Stephanie Flanders, former BBC economics editor
 Jonathan Freedland, journalist and broadcaster
 Paul Gambaccini, music journalist and broadcaster
 Carrie Gracie, BBC newsreader
 Tom Gross, journalist and commentator
 Krishnan Guru-Murthy, Channel 4 news reader
 Guto Harri, former BBC political correspondent and Communications Director for the Mayor of London
 Tim Harford, British economist and journalist
 John Harris, British journalist, writer, and critic
 Julia Hartley Brewer, British journalist and broadcaster
 Mehdi Hasan, British political journalist and host of UpFront on Al Jazeera English
 Afua Hirsch, journalist and lawyer
 Simon Jack, BBC News Business Editor
 Peter Jay, British journalist, economist and diplomat,
 Simon Jenkins, journalist and columnist; former editor of The Times newspaper
 Oliver Kamm, columnist and leader writer for The Times
 Ian Katz, editor of BBC's Newsnight and former deputy editor of The Guardian
 Lucy Kellaway, British journalist, writer and broadcaster
 Tasmin Khan, television newsreader
 Christina Lamb, journalist; foreign correspondent for The Sunday Times
 David Lipsey, Baron Lipsey, British journalist and Labour peer
 Edward Luce, British journalist
 Christopher Meakin, journalist,  Financial Times, The Times, Punch : banker at HSBC and J P Morgan
 Seumas Milne, journalist and writer; Executive Director of Strategy and Communications, British Labour Party
 Bronwen Maddox, editor and chief executive of Prospect magazine
 Michael Mosley Medical and scientific broadcaster
 Robert Peston, Former BBC News Business editor, Political Editor, ITV News
 Rebecca Pike, BBC business and economics correspondent
 Lance Price, former BBC journalist and special advisor to Tony Blair
 James Robbins, journalist and former BBC Diplomatic and Royal Editor
 Nick Robinson, journalist and broadcaster; former BBC political editor
 Justin Rowlatt, journalist and news reporter; currently the BBC's Chief Environment correspondent
 Will Self, British journalist and author
 John Sergeant, former BBC political journalist
 Mary Ann Sieghart, British journalist
 Matthew Syed, British journalist and broadcaster
 Manisha Tank, presenter, BBC World News
 Philippa Thomas, BBC presenter
 Emma Tucker, editor, The Sunday Times
 Etienne de Villiers, Former chairman, BBC Worldwide
 Hilary Wainwright, British academic, editor of Red Pepper magazine.
 Andreas Whittam Smith, former editor of The Independent newspaper
 Tom Winnifrith, British former journalist and businessman
 Camilla Wright, a British journalist and one of the founders and owners of the Popbitch newsletter and website
 Toby Young, journalist

Others

 Riz Ahmed, British-Pakistani rapper, actor and anti-war activist
 David Alderdice, Dermatologist, Northern Irish politician and former Lord Mayor of Belfast
 Naomi Alderman, novelist and writer
 Monica Ali, writer
 Tariq Ali, political writer, broadcaster and publisher
 Chris Anderson, curator of the TED Conference
 Maudy Ayunda, Indonesian singer-songwriter and actress
 Richard Barrons, Major General in the British Army
 Ruzwana Bashir, British Pakistani businesswoman, founder and CEO of Peek.com
 Nina Bawden, Novelist and children's writer
 Freda Bedi, social worker, writer and Gelongma (nun in Tibetan Buddhism)
 Isaiah Berlin, philosopher
 Tim Besley, economist
 Roy Bhaskar, philosopher
 Stephen Breyer, US Supreme Court Justice
 Alex Callinicos, Professor of European & International Studies (social theory and international political economy), King's College London
 Justin Cartwright, novelist and dramatist
 Guido Calabresi, American appeal judge and law and economics scholar
 Suma Chakrabarti, former President of the European Bank for Reconstruction and Development
 Vikramaditya Chandra, CEO, NDTV
 Wesley Clark, former US Army General and Supreme Allied Commander Europe for NATO
 Diane Coyle, journalist, economist and vice-chairman of the BBC Trust
 John Crow, fifth Governor of the Bank of Canada
 John Curtice, political scientist and Professor of Politics at the University of Strathclyde
 Ian Davis, former managing director McKinsey & Co.
 Pete Dawkins, former Heisman trophy winner
 Nick Denton, CEO of Gawker Media
 Michael Dobbs, British author
 Rose Dugdale, former IRA prisoner and Sinn Féin activist
 Michael Dummett, philosopher
 Paul W. Franks, Professor of Philosophy and Judaic Studies at Yale University
 Atul Gawande, American surgeon and writer
 Norman Geras, British political theorist and academic
 Steve Giddins, British chess player and writer
 Maurizio Giuliano, Italian-British journalist, Guinness record-holder, and UN official
 Matt Golder, political scientist
 Edward Goldsmith, Anglo-French environmentalist
 Andrew Graham, economist
 John N. Gray, philosopher
 Adrian Greenwood, historian and art dealer
 Bo Guagua, son of Chinese ex-politician Bo Xilai and Gu Kailai
 Susan Haack, British philosopher at the University of Miami
 Tony Hall, Director-General of the BBC and former Chief Executive of the Royal Opera House
 Guy Hands, British financier
 Dido Harding, British businesswoman, former chief executive of TalkTalk Group 
 Stephen Hester, Chief Executive of RSA Insurance Group
 Christopher Hitchens, English-American author and polemicist
 John Holmes, British diplomat and UN Under-Secretary-General
 Haya Bint Al Hussein, daughter of Hussein of Jordan, UN messenger of peace
 Walter Isaacson, American writer
 Antony Jenkins, former CEO of Barclays
 Paul Johnson, economist, Director of the Institute for Fiscal Studies
 David Kirk, New Zealand businessman and former All Black
 Girish Karnad, an Indian writer, playwright and screenwriter
 Sanjaya Lall, economist
 Mark Littlewood, Director General of the Institute of Economic Affairs
 Ken Macdonald, former Director of Public Prosecutions for England and Wales
 Henry Marsh, British neurosurgeon and focus of the documentary film The English Surgeon Stephen McIntyre, author of Climate Audit dedicated to analyzing climate data
 Max More, British philosopher and futurist
 Rupert Murdoch, Australian-American media mogul
 Anton Muttukumaru, Sri Lankan army officer and diplomat
 Adebayo Ogunlesi, Nigerian businessman
 Nicky Oppenheimer, South African businessman
 Nicholas Ostler, British linguist and author
 Ricken Patel, activist and co-founder of online campaigning organisation Avaaz
 Teddy Pilley, linguist and conference interpreter
 Ben Pimlott, historian
 Max Price, vice-chancellor and principal of the University of Cape Town
 Dennis Potter, British television playwright
 Catherine Powell, CEO of Disney Parks, Western Region
 Hugh Quarshie, British actor
 James A. Reed (businessman), Chairman of the Reed Group
 Peter Robinson, former speechwriter for U.S. President Ronald Reagan and host of television show Uncommon Knowledge''
 Joe Roff, Australian rugby player
 Jim Rogers, investor and author
 Jonathan Rowson, Scottish chess Grandmaster and three-time winner of the British Chess Championship
 Anthony Seldon, contemporary historian, commentator and political author
 Vikram Seth, Indian novelist and poet
 Stuart Shanker, Distinguished Research Professor at York University
 Jonathan Shaw, British Major general 
 Guy Spier, Investor, Author
 Bob Sternfels, global managing partner at McKinsey & Company
 Richard Swinburne, philosopher
 Charles Taylor, Canadian philosopher and politician
 Gabriele Taylor, Fellow and Tutor in Philosophy at St Anne's College, Oxford
 Alexander Thynn, Marquess of Bath, British peer, writer and owner of Longleat
 Stephen Tindale, British environmentalist
 Badruddin Umar, Bangladeshi Marxist–Leninist theorist, historian and writer
 Shriti Vadera, Baroness Vadera, Chairwoman of Santander UK
 Chad Varah, founder of the Samaritans
 Florian Henckel von Donnersmarck, film director and screenwriter
 Tom Ward, British actor
 Sundeep Waslekar,  Indian thought leader on conflict resolution and global future
 Madeleine Wickham, chick lit author, famous as Sophie Kinsella
 George Will, American political journalist and commentator
 Richard Wollheim, British philosopher
 Mara Yamauchi, British Olympic marathon runner
 Malala Yousafzai, Pakistani activist for female education and youngest Nobel laureate

References

External links
 Philosophy, Politics and Economics - University of Oxford
 Why does PPE rule Britain?
 PPE: the Oxford degree that runs Britain

 PPE
United Kingdom politics-related lists